Guido Marzorati (born 1975, Venice, Italy) is a guitarist, singer, and songwriter. The son of professional musicians, he studied for several years at the Benedetto Marcello Music Conservatory. During this time he learned the acoustic guitar, influenced by The Beatles, Elliott Murphy and Bruce Springsteen, all of whom would eventually mark his style.
In August 1999 he recorded his first solo album (voice, guitar, harmonica), Live at Home.
In September 2000 he won the Bande Rumorose contest in Copparo (Fe).  That same month, specialist magazines Buscadero and The River ran feature articles on Marzorati.

During Spring 2003, he moved to New York and conducted a tour of several clubs, such as Stone Pony and C-Note. 
In Summer 2002, he formed his relationship with The Blugos, a new band which helped him record his second album Journey of Hope in 2004, a combination of warm '70s rock and electronic music.
Currently, he tours Italy with artists such as Treves Blues Band and Joe Grushecky and the Houserockers.

Discography 
 Live at Home (1999) - Balancing Act Records
 Journey of Hope (2004) - Balancing Act Records

External links
 Official Site
 Myspace Site

1975 births
Living people
Italian musicians